Lenny Valentino was a dream pop band from Mysłowice, Poland formed in 1998. They disbanded in 2001. Lenny Valentino formed in 1998, with guitarist/vocalist Artur Rojek (of the band Myslovitz) as the primary songwriter. Mietall Waluś (bass), Michał Koterba (guitar), and Wojciech Kuderski (drums) completed the band. The band's name is taken from a song by British group The Auteurs: "Lenny Valentino" appears on the 1994 album Now I'm a Cowboy. Kuderski was replaced on drums by Bartosz Królikowski in 1999. In 2000, Lenny Valentino underwent further personnel changes and added all three members of Ścianka—Maciej Cieślak (guitar), Arkady Kowalczyk (drums), and Jacek Lachowicz (keyboard).

Their first and only album, Uwaga! Jedzie tramwaj (roughly: Watch out! The tram is coming), was recorded in April 2001 and produced by Cieślak. The album was released on 12 November 2001 on Sissy Records, a branch of BMG. Uwaga! Jedzie tramwaj received mostly positive reviews, including an MTV Poland award.

After touring Poland in support of their album, Lenny Valentino disbanded in December 2001 and the members focused on other projects. Rojek continued to work with Myslovitz, Waluś focused on Negatyw's debut album Paczatarez, and the other three returned to Ścianka.

In 2006, they performed at Off Festival, of which Rojek is creative director, in their hometown Mysłowice.

Members
 Artur Rojek (1998–2001) — vocals, guitar; member of Myslovitz
 Mietall Waluś (1998–2001) — bass; member of Penny Lane, Negatyw, Kurtyna
 Michał Koterba (1998–2000) — guitar; member of Korbowód
 Wojciech "Lala" Kuderski (1998–1999) — drums; member of Myslovitz, Penny Lane
 Bartosz Królikowski (1999–2000) — drums
 Maciej Cieślak (2000–2001) — guitar; member of Ścianka
 Arkady Kowalczyk (2000–2001) — drums; member of Ścianka
 Jacek Lachowicz (2000–2001) — keyboard; member of Ścianka, Kobiety

Discography

References

Polish rock music groups
Musical groups established in 1998
Musical groups disestablished in 2001
Mysłowice